The Rupp's African climbing mouse (Dendromus ruppi) is a species of rodent in the family Nesomyidae. It is found in South Sudan.

References 

Dendromus
Mammals of Africa
Mammals described in 2009